Aurélien Boche (born 16 September 1981) is a retired French football defender who currently plays for Nîmes Olympique.

References

1981 births
Living people
People from Niort
Association football defenders
French footballers
La Roche VF players
Angoulême Charente FC players
AS Cherbourg Football players
Amiens SC players
Nîmes Olympique players
Ligue 2 players
Sportspeople from Deux-Sèvres
Footballers from Nouvelle-Aquitaine